Francis Wilson may refer to the following people:

Military and politics
Francis Wilson (political scientist) (1901–1976)
Francis A. Wilson, American soldier and Medal of Honor recipient
Francis Adrian Wilson (1874–1954), British Army officer
Francis Ford Wilson (1865–1919), Australian politician
Francis H. Wilson (1844–1910), U.S. Representative from New York
Francis Ormond Wilson (born 1931), diplomat of New Zealand
Francis Stuart Wilson (1883–1915), Royal Marines officer and pilot, also a first-class cricketer in Jamaica

Science
Francis Wilson (lichenologist) (1832–1903), Australian lichenologist
Francis Wilson (meteorologist) (born 1949), British weather forecaster
Francis Erasmus Wilson (1888–1960), Australian scientist who named Manorina melanotis, or black-eared miner, a species of bird

Sports
Francis Wilson (English cricketer) (1876–1964), British Army officer, also a first-class cricketer in England
Francis Wilson (footballer) (1848–1886), English footballer who appeared in the 1875 FA Cup Final
Francis Wilson (rugby union) (1876–?), British rugby union player who competed in the 1900 Summer Olympics
Francis Stuart Wilson (1883–1915), Royal Marines officer and pilot, also a first-class cricketer in Jamaica

Other
Francis Wilson (actor) (1854–1935), American actor
Francis Wilson (economist) (born 1939), South African economist
Francis Gordon Wilson (1900–1959), New Zealand architect
Francis S. Wilson (1872–1951), American jurist
Francis W. Wilson (1870–1947), American architect

See also
Frank Wilson (disambiguation)
Frances Wilson (disambiguation)